Triza Atuka (born 14 April 1992) is a Kenyan volleyball player. She is part of the Kenya women's national volleyball team. At club level she plays for the Kenya Pipeline Company team. In 2016, the Kenya Volleyball Federation awarded her their female Most Valuable Player award.

In 2017 she was captain of the Pipeline team in Cairo as they contested the Women’s Africa Club Volleyball Championship.

When Kenya's team for the postponed 2020 Summer Olympics in Tokyo was announced in 2021 Atuka together with other experienced players Violet Makuto and Elizabeth Wanyama were not in the dozen players chosen to travel to Japan.

References

1992 births
Living people
Kenyan women's volleyball players
People from Kakamega